Christopher Shawn Patrick Canty (born March 30, 1976) is a former American college and professional football player who was a cornerback in the National Football League (NFL) and Arena Football League (AFL).  He played college football for Kansas State University, and was a two-time All-American.  A first-round pick in the 1997 NFL Draft, he played professionally for the New England Patriots, Seattle Seahawks, and New Orleans Saints of the NFL, and Las Vegas Gladiators and Rio Grande Valley Dorados of the Arena League.

Early years
Canty was born in Long Beach, California.  He attended Eastern Regional High School in Voorhees Township, New Jersey, and played for the Eastern Vikings high school football team.

College career
Canty attended Kansas State University, where he played for the Kansas State Wildcats football team from 1994 to 1996.  He was recognized as a consensus first-team All-American as a sophomore in 1995 and junior in 1996 and won the Jack Tatum Award as a junior.  He decided to forgo his final season of college eligibility and entered the NFL Draft.

Professional career

The New England Patriots selected Canty with the twenty-ninth overall pick in the first round of the 1997 NFL Draft.  Over four NFL seasons, he played for the Patriots as well as the New Orleans Saints and Seattle Seahawks.  In 58 career games for those three NFL teams, he had four interceptions and 126 tackles.

He finished his pro career playing for the Las Vegas Gladiators of the Arena Football League and the Rio Grande Valley Dorados of af2.

See also
 List of Arena Football League and National Football League players

External sources
AFL article

References 

1976 births
Living people
All-American college football players
American football cornerbacks
Eastern Regional High School alumni
Kansas State Wildcats football players
Las Vegas Gladiators players
New England Patriots players
New Orleans Saints players
Sportspeople from Camden County, New Jersey
People from Voorhees Township, New Jersey
Rio Grande Valley Dorados players
Seattle Seahawks players
Sportspeople from the Delaware Valley
Players of American football from Long Beach, California
Players of American football from New Jersey